The 1979 Ice Hockey World Championships took place at the Palace of Sports of the Central Lenin Stadium in Moscow, Soviet Union from 14 to 27 April. Eight teams took part, with the first round split into two groups of four, and the best two from each group advancing to the final group. The four best teams then played each other twice in the final round. This was the 46th World Championship and at the same time, the 57th European Championship.  In the May 1978 congress many rules were aligned with NHL practices and archaic rules (like changing ends half way the third period) were finally officially abandoned.  The games were very well attended, setting a record by averaging over eleven thousand spectators per game.

The Soviets wished the tournament to be finished before the May Day celebrations began, so the schedule was moved up one week allowing for less NHL players being eligible.  The hosts won all seven games they played capturing their 16th title, the only game that was even close was their early match with West Germany, which they won three to two.  The competition for the bronze (at least) was tight with Sweden edging out the Canadians.  After the tournament NHL star Marcel Dionne praised the level of play and offered the following criticism of North American play, "only the media can change things here. Tell them how the European teams play with so much talent. Tell them that they play without a fight. Let them realize that if a kid does not know how to skate and shoot, but just to fight, he should not be allowed to be a hockey player. There are so many idiots who run hockey, so stupid, so stupid. Tell them."

Promotion and relegation was effective for 1981 as the IIHF ceased running a championship in Olympic years.  Nations that did not participate in the Lake Placid Olympics were invited to compete in the inaugural Thayer Tutt Trophy.

World Championship Group A (Soviet Union)

First round
Results between countries that moved on to the same group in the second round were carried forward.

Group 1

Group 2

Final round

Consolation round

World Championship Group B (Romania)
Played in Galați March 16–24.  This year's tournament was expanded to ten teams to try to avoid hostilities between China and South Korea, and to address a complaint by the Danes that Austria had used an ineligible player in achieving promotion in 1978.  China and Denmark were both elevated with the consequence that four teams would be relegated.

First round
The ten teams were split into groups of five, the top two of each battled for promotion to Group A, the next two played in a group to decide fifth through eighth, and both bottom place teams were simply relegated without playing further.  Additionally, the top two in each group joined all Group A teams at the Lake Placid Olympics.

Group 1

Hungary was relegated to Group C.

Group 2

China was relegated to Group C.

Final round

The Netherlands were promoted to Group A.

Consolation round

Both Austria and Denmark were relegated to Group C.

World Championship Group C (Spain)
Played in Barcelona March 16–25.  This tournament was supposed to be played in China but the Chinese said that they would deny entrance to the South Korean team.  To avoid political issues with the two playing each other, both China and Denmark (last year's 3rd and 4th place teams) were elevated to Group B and two extra nations were allowed to participate in Group C.

''Both Yugoslavia and Italy were promoted to Group B.

Ranking and statistics

Tournament Awards
Best players selected by the directorate:
Best Goaltender:       Vladislav Tretiak
Best Defenceman:       Valeri Vasiliev
Best Forward:          Wilf Paiement
Media All-Star Team:
Goaltender:  Vladislav Tretiak
Defence:  Jiří Bubla,  Valeri Vasiliev
Forwards:  Sergei Makarov,  Boris Mikhailov,  Vladimir Petrov

Final standings
The final standings of the tournament according to IIHF:

European championships final standings
The final standings of the European championships according to IIHF:

Citations

References
Complete results

IIHF Men's World Ice Hockey Championships
World Championships
World Ice Hockey Championships
International ice hockey competitions hosted by the Soviet Union
April 1979 sports events in Europe
Sports competitions in Moscow
1979 in Moscow
1979 in Russian sport
March 1979 sports events in Europe
1979 in Catalonia
Sports competitions in Barcelona
1970s in Barcelona
International ice hockey competitions hosted by Spain
Sport in Galați
International ice hockey competitions hosted by Romania
1978–79 in Romanian ice hockey
1978–79 in Spanish ice hockey